Soundtrack is the first EP released by American rock band Fastball. All four songs debuted previously through their Patreon page before being released on all streaming platforms.

Music critic Peter Blackstock says of Fastball's EP, "[Soundtrack] continues their winning roll. Scalzo’s hard-hitting 'Chump Change' and pop-sweet 'Electric Cool-Aide' balance against Zuniga’s moodier 'House on the Edge of the World'; and the midtempo title track."

All four songs from the EP were included in Fastball's ninth studio album, "The Deep End."

Background
The EP was recorded in June 2021, produced by Steve Berlin, and engineered by Charlie Kramsky. Berlin also produced the band's The Help Machine album.

On the premiere episode of The Austin Downbeat, Zuniga explained the band "[fell] out of love with this old idea" of traditional album releases, and has decided to release EPs instead. He added Fastball recorded a number of originals and cover songs, some produced by the band itself, and others by Steve Berlin.

Tony Scalzo debuted a demo of "Electric Cool-Aide", an autobiographical song, on the band's YouTube page.

Miles Zuniga began writing "House on the Edge of the World" in March 2021.

Track listing 
 "Soundtrack" (Miles Zuniga) – 2:49
 "Chump Change" (Tony Scalzo) – 2:19
 "House on the Edge of the World" (Zuniga) – 2:57
 "Electric Cool-Aide" (Scalzo) – 3:12

Personnel
Fastball
 Tony Scalzo – vocals, bass guitar, keyboards, guitar
 Miles Zuniga – vocals, guitar
 Joey Shuffield – drums, percussion

Guest musicians
 Bruce Hughes – bass guitar, additional vocals

References

External links
 Official website
 Soundtrack (EP) on Apple Music
 Fastball on Spotify

2022 EPs
Fastball (band) albums